The New York Mets are a professional Major League Baseball (MLB) franchise based in New York City, New York in the borough of Queens. They play in the National League East division. In the history of the Mets there have been 24 managers that managed a game including four interim managers. Of those managers, only Joe Torre was a player-manager (a manager who also plays for the team); Yogi Berra did play four games while he was a coach for the Mets in 1965. Gil Hodges, Roy McMillan, Bud Harrelson, Mike Cubbage, Dallas Green, Bobby Valentine and Willie Randolph all also played in MLB for the Mets prior to becoming the team's manager.

The Mets posted their franchise record for losses in their inaugural season in the league, with 120 losses in 160 games in 1962. This was the first of seven consecutive losing seasons, a season in which the winning percentage was below .500, and the most losses by a post-1900 MLB team. During this stretch from 1962 to 1968, the Mets employed four managers. Five managers have taken the Mets to the postseason; Davey Johnson, Bobby Valentine and Terry Collins have led the team to two playoff appearances each. Johnson and Gil Hodges are the only Mets managers to win a World Series: Hodges in 1969 against the Baltimore Orioles; and Johnson in 1986 against the Boston Red Sox. Terry Collins is the longest-tenured manager in franchise history, with 1,134 games of service over 7 seasons.

The manager with the most wins and highest winning percentage over a full season or more is Johnson; his 595–417 record gives him a .588 winning percentage. Conversely, the worst winning percentage over a full season or more in franchise history is .302 by inaugural manager Casey Stengel, who posted a 175–404 record from 1962 to 1965.

Carlos Beltrán was hired as the Mets' manager after the 2019 season but he was fired from the position before managing any games due to his involvement in the Houston Astros sign stealing scandal. Luis Rojas was hired in his place as manager for the 2020 season, However on October 4, 2021 after 2021 season the Mets has declined his option contract after two seasons lost for the playoffs. On December 20, 2021, Buck Showalter was announced as the club’s 23rd manager.

Table key

Managers
Statistics current as of October 5, 2022

References

General
 
 
 

Specific

 
Lists of Major League Baseball managers
Managers